Rinat Nuraliyevich Aitov (born 10 August 1972) is a Russian professional football coach and a former player.

External links

1972 births
Living people
Russian footballers
Russian football managers
Association football defenders
FC Volga Ulyanovsk players